Finding Darwin's God: A Scientist's Search for Common Ground Between God and Evolution is a 2000 book by the American cell biologist and Roman Catholic Kenneth R. Miller wherein he argues that evolution does not contradict religious faith. Miller argues that evolution occurred, that Earth is not young, that science must work based on methodological naturalism, and that evolution cannot be construed as an effective argument for atheism.

References

Reviews
Review of Finding Darwin's God by Henry E. Neufeld (theistic evolutionist)
Review of Kenneth Miller's "Finding Darwin's God" by Michael Ruse for Metanexus Institute (agnostic)
Yin and Yang of Kenneth Miller: How Professor Miller finds Darwin's God by Amiel Rossow (skeptic)
Finding Miller's King by Jed Macosko (ID creationist)
Finding An Evolutionist's God by Henry M. Morris (young earth creationist)
Review of Kenneth Miller's Finding Darwin's God by Edward B. Davis (Christian historian of science), based on a version published by Reports of the National Center for Science Education 22.1-2 (Jan-Apr 2002): 47–8.

External links
Official website

1999 non-fiction books
1999 in science
1999 in Christianity
Science books
Books by Kenneth R. Miller